For the 1987–88 West Ham United F.C. season in English football, West Ham United finished 16th in the league.

Season summary
Again John Lyall waited until three quarters of the season had passed before bringing any new signings to the club.  Even so, the two players he did eventually bring in, Julian Dicks and Leroy Rosenior, would play a major part in helping the club to just avoid relegation for the second season running.

Alan Dickens had to play most of the season as a striker as Frank McAvennie had signed for Celtic without a replacement being found until Rosenior's arrival.

West Ham finally finished in 16th place in the First Division.

Midfielder Stewart Robson was voted club player of the year, though Tony Cottee was once again top goalscorer with 13 in the league and 15 in all competitions. However, Cottee would be sold to Everton for a national record £2.2 million by the start of the following season, leaving manager Lyall with a big gap to fill in the forward positions as he had lost his two highest goalscorers within a year of each other.

League table

Results
West Ham United's score comes first

Football League First Division

FA Cup

League Cup

Squad

References

West Ham United F.C. seasons
West Ham United
West Ham United
West Ham United